Bruceia is a genus of moths in the family Erebidae.

Species
 Bruceia hubbardi Dyar, 1898
 Bruceia pulverina Neumögen, 1893

References

External links
Natural History Museum Lepidoptera generic names catalog

Cisthenina
Moth genera